Orrick is an international law firm founded in San Francisco, California. The firm advises on transactions, litigation and regulatory matters for venture-backed companies, public companies, E&I funds, financial institutions and governments.

History

Founded in San Francisco in 1863, Orrick earliest work included funding the Golden Gate Bridge construction, shaping the California Corporate Securities Act and the first offerings under the Securities Act of 1933, and litigating over hydroelectric power and water development rights in the Lake Tahoe region.

In the 1980s, the firm began expanding outside of the Bay Area, establishing offices in New York and Los Angeles. By the late 1990s, it opened its first international offices in Tokyo and London and Paris followed in 2002. Additionally, in 2002, Orrick opened its “Global Operations Center” in Wheeling, WV.

Orrick acquired 40 lawyers and their litigation practices from Donovan, Leisure, Newton & Irvine in 1998.

In 2003, the firm added a team from the Venture Law Group (VLG). In 2005 at the expense of the now-defunct law firm Coudert Brothers Orrick expanded its London office and opened offices in Hong Kong, Beijing and Shanghai with Coudert Brothers professionals.

In 2006, the firm engaged in merger negotiations with legacy Wall Street firm Dewey Ballantine; the merger was unsuccessful. The same year, Orrick expanded its Paris office through a combination with Rambaud Martel, a M&A and dispute resolution firm in France.

In 2008, Orrick expanded into Germany by combining with Hölters & Elsing (Partnerschaft von Rechtsanwälten); today, the firm has offices in Düsseldorf and Munich.

Also in 2008, the firm admitted almost two dozen partners in its London, New York, San Francisco, Seattle, and Washington, D.C., offices from the San Francisco firm Heller Ehrman, including 27 hired after Heller's Sept. 26, 2008, announcement of dissolution.

In 2013, Mitch Zuklie, a Silicon Valley tech lawyer, assumed the role of firm Chairman & CEO.

In June 2017, Orrick was announced as one of thirty law firms piloting the Mansfield Rule. Created by Diversity Lab, and modeled after the NFL's Rooney Rule the Mansfield Rule is named after Arabella Mansfield, the first woman admitted to practice in the US.

More recent office openings have included Geneva in 2015, Houston in 2016, and Boston in 2019.

In September 2019, Orrick became one of five founding law firms in the Diversity Lab's Move the Needle Fund 15. A five-year effort that will apply research-backed methods, the initiative brings together corporate legal departments, law firms and community leaders to help accelerate meaningful change in the legal profession through measurable goals.

In 2022, Orrick, Herrington & Sutcliffe was a founding member of the Legal Alliance for Reproductive Rights, a coalition of United States law firms offering free legal services to people seeking and providing abortions in the wake of Dobbs v. Jackson Women's Health Organization, which overruled Roe v. Wade.

Recognition and rankings
Law360 named Orrick to its Global 20 list for the eighth time in 2019.

Financial Times named Orrick North America's most digital law firm in 2020. Between 2016 and 2020, they named Orrick North America&#39's most innovative law firm three times and runner-up two times.

Fortune recognized Orrick as one of its 100 Best Companies to Work For in 2020 for the fifth consecutive year.

The American Lawyer included Orrick among the top 5 firms on its 2020 A-List.

Law360 named Orrick as Employment Law Group of the Year for the fifth time and Project Finance Group of the Year for the seventh time in 2020. They also named the firm Tech

Group of the Year for the third time in 2018, IP Group of the Year for the fourth time in 2016, and Privacy Group of the Year in 2016.

The American Lawyer named Orrick as Intellectual Property Litigation Department of the Year for 2015. In addition, the firm was one of six finalists for Litigation Department of the Year in 2016. The Recorder recognized Orrick's California-based employment litigation team as California Labor & Employment Department of the Year for the fourth consecutive year in 2017.

The National Law Journal named Orrick to its Appellate Hot List for the ninth time in 2020.

Global Arbitration Review (GAR) included Orrick in its 2020 list of the world's top 30 international arbitration practices.

Pitchbook ranked Orrick #3 globally and #1 in Europe for venture capital in 2019.

Bloomberg ranked Orrick top 5 for tech litigation in 2020 11 and top 5 for global M&A in 2019.

The Deal ranked Orrick #1 out-of-court creditor firm 13 and #3 bankruptcy firm in 2019.

The Bond Buyer ranked Orrick #1 bond counsel in 2019, a position the firm has held for two decades.

Orrick's London technology team was recognized as the Service Provider of the Year at the 18th annual Investor AllStars awards.

The Diversity Lab named Orrick as a Mansfield Certified Plus firm for the third year in a row in 2020.

Minority Corporate Counsel Association (MCCA) awarded Orrick with the 2020 Thomas L. Sager Award. The award is for Am Law 200 law firms committed to a more diverse workforce and improving the hiring, retention and promotion of diverse attorneys.

Orrick was named one of the "50 Best Law Firms for Women" by Working Mother magazine for the eleventh time and Yale Law Women's list of top firms for gender equality and family friendliness for the eighth time in 2020.

Orrick ranked #8 out of 220 firms on The American Lawyer's 2017 Diversity Scorecard.

Orrick earned a score of 100 percent for the fourteenth consecutive year in the 2020 Human Rights Campaign's annual Corporate Equality Index (CEI) and Best Places to Work survey.

Vault 2021 named Orrick #1 for Tech & Innovation, #2 for Best Firm to Work For and #2 for Wellness.

Orrick's summer associate programs were ranked #1 in five markets across the U.S. in The American Lawyer's 2017 Summer Associates Survey and the firm was ranked #20 in the publication's 2020 Mid-Level Associates survey.

Activities
Orrick was ranked #9 for U.S. pro bono impact and #6 for international pro bono impact by The American Lawyer in its 2017 pro bono rankings. In 2015, Orrick was named to Law360's list of Pro Bono All Stars.

An Orrick team worked on the legislation enacted in California in October 2017 to criminalize sexual extortion, part of a national effort on behalf of the firm's pro bono client Legal Momentum.

Orrick lawyers provided legal and technical assistance to the Public International Law & Policy Group on public international law issues facing countries in the Middle East aspiring to become democracies, including Egypt, Libya, Syria and Tunisia.

Orrick managed asylum to three family members of the Demiraj family in an asylum case that was submitted and approved by the U.S. Supreme Court.

In 2014, the firm launched the Orrick Cares program in celebration of Orrick's 150th anniversary.

On Veterans Day in 2014, the firm announced the launch of the Veterans' Legal Career Fair. The event matches legal employers with lawyers who are veterans, active-duty service members or military spouses.

Orrick was the first global law firm to establish an Impact Finance & Social Enterprise practice.

Notable lawyers and alumni

Charles C. Adams Jr., United States Ambassador to Finland (2015–2017)
Wei Christianson, CEO of China and Co-CEO of Asia Pacific at Morgan Stanley
Melinda Haag, United States Attorney for the Northern District of California (2010–2016)
Eric Johnson, Mayor of Dallas (2019–present)
Sergey Lagodinsky, Member of the European Parliament for Germany (2019–present)
Sean Patrick Maloney, U.S. Representative for New York's 18th congressional district (2013–present)
Rob McKenna, Attorney General of Washington (2005–2013)
Brian T. Moran, United States Attorney for the Western District of Washington (2019–2021)
Kimberly J. Mueller, Judge of the United States District Court for the Eastern District of California (2010–present)
Raul Anthony Ramirez, Judge of the United States District Court for the Eastern District of California (1980–1989)
McGregor W. Scott, United States Attorney for the Eastern District of California (2003–2009; 2017–2021)

See also
List of largest United States-based law firms by profits per partner

References

External links

Orrick website

Law firms established in 1885
Law firms based in San Francisco
Intellectual property law firms
Patent law firms
Foreign law firms with offices in Hong Kong
Foreign law firms with offices in Japan
Orrick family